The 1976 Baltimore Orioles season was a season in American baseball. It involved the Orioles finishing second in the American League East with a record of 88 wins and 74 losses.

Offseason 
 January 7, 1976: Wayne Krenchicki was selected by the Orioles in the first round (7th pick) of the 1976 Major League Baseball Draft Secondary Phase.
 April 2, 1976: Don Baylor, Mike Torrez, and Paul Mitchell were traded to the Oakland Athletics for Reggie Jackson, Ken Holtzman, and Bill VanBommell (minors).

Regular season 
This was the first season since 1957 that an Oriole other than Brooks Robinson got the most starts at third base, with Doug DeCinces taking over the position for the  future Hall of Famer.

Following the early April trade, Reggie Jackson did not immediately report; his first plate appearance was on

Season standings

Record vs. opponents

Notable transactions 
 April 8, 1976: Bobby Brown was released by the Orioles.
 June 8, 1976: Dallas Williams was selected in the first round (20th pick) of the 1976 Major League Baseball Draft.
 June 15, 1976: Doyle Alexander, Jimmy Freeman, Elrod Hendricks, Ken Holtzman, and Grant Jackson were traded to the New York Yankees for Rudy May, Tippy Martinez, Dave Pagan, Scott McGregor, and Rick Dempsey.
 October 1, 1976: Dave Johnson was purchased by the expansion Seattle Mariners.

Roster

Player stats

Batting

Starters by position 
Note: Pos = Position; G = Games played; AB = At bats; H = Hits; Avg. = Batting average; HR = Home runs; RBI = Runs batted in

Other batters 
Note: G = Games played; AB = At bats; H = Hits; Avg. = Batting average; HR = Home runs; RBI = Runs batted in

Pitching

Starting pitchers 
Note: G = Games pitched; IP = Innings pitched; W = Wins; L = Losses; ERA = Earned run average; SO = Strikeouts

Other pitchers 
Note: G = Games pitched; IP = Innings pitched; W = Wins; L = Losses; ERA = Earned run average; SO = Strikeouts

Relief pitchers 
Note: G = Games pitched; W = Wins; L = Losses; SV = Saves; ERA = Earned run average; SO = Strikeouts

Farm system

Notes

References 

1976 Baltimore Orioles team page at Baseball Reference
1976 Baltimore Orioles season at baseball-almanac.com

Baltimore Orioles seasons
Baltimore Orioles season
Baltimore Orioles